Maria Fisker Stokholm (born 3 October 1990) is a Danish handball player for Viborg HK and the Danish national team.

She was given the award of Cetățean de onoare ("Honorary Citizen") of the city of Bucharest in 2016.

Achievements
World Championship:
Bronze Medalist: 2013
Fourth place: 2011
Danish Championship:
Winner: 2008, 2009, 2014
Danish Cup:
Winner: 2007, 2008, 2012, 2014, 2016 
Danish Supercup:
Winner: 2011
Romanian Championship:
Winner: 2016
EHF Champions League:
Winner: 2009, 2016
EHF Cup Winners' Cup:
Winner: 2014
EHF Cup:
Winner: 2010

Individual awards
All-Star Left Wing of the World Championship: 2013
All-Star Left Wing of the European Championship: 2014
 Handball-Planet.com Best Left Wing: 2014

References

1990 births
Living people
People from Hadsten
Danish female handball players
Viborg HK players
Expatriate handball players
Danish expatriate sportspeople in Romania
Sportspeople from the Central Denmark Region